Mali Housing Bank (fr ) also known by the acronym BHM was a Malian mortgage institution that was a major actor in the Malian property sector from inception until its absorption by another bank. Founded in 1996, following a restructuring of a now defunct Postal and Savings Bank, BHM, persistently battled a weak balance sheet due to high ratio of non-performing loans, it was later merged with the stronger Mali Solidarity Bank (BMS) in 2016.

History

Challenges 
Two years into its formation, the bank was embroiled in governance and inadequate capital challenges. In addition, there was a perception that loans disbursed by the bank were a form of government mortgage subsidy, ten years later, about three-quarters of its loans were non-performing. Many loans to housing developers did not result in completed projects and the firm was constrained by inadequate long term funding. In 2016, BHM merged with the Mali Solidarity Bank, a financial institution with a stronger balance sheet than BHM.

Objectives of the institution 

 Provide financial support to the housing market in Mali.
 Provision of full banking services
 Manage post office savings and checking accounts.

References 

Banks of Mali
Banks established in 1996
Defunct companies of Mali
Economic history of Mali